Radio Holger was a Danish radio station transmitting in Metropolitan Copenhagen, Denmark.

The radio station was a small and local radio station, which has become notable for being critical towards Islam and Islams influence in Denmark and the rest of the world.

External links 
 Radio holger

Sources
 TV Syd
 Mediesekretariatet (PDF)

Radio stations in Denmark
Islam in Denmark
Mass media in Copenhagen
Radio stations disestablished in 2013 
Defunct radio stations 
Defunct mass media in Denmark